Norman Robert "Bud" Poile (February 10, 1924 – January 4, 2005) was a professional ice hockey player, coach, general manager, and league executive. Bud is the brother of Don Poile, and the father of David Poile.

Overview
Poile was born in Fort William, Ontario, and played junior hockey for the Fort William Rangers. He began his professional career in 1942 as an 18-year-old right winger for the Toronto Maple Leafs and—after a break in his career to serve in the Second World War—was a member of the Leafs' Stanley Cup-winning team of 1947. The next season, he was traded to the Chicago Black Hawks in a multi-player deal for Max Bentley. A year later he was dealt to the Detroit Red Wings. Before the 1949–50 season he was acquired by the New York Rangers and was traded mid-season to the Boston Bruins, which would be his final stop in the NHL.

Poile would spend five more years playing in minor professional leagues as a player-coach, first for the Tulsa Oilers of the United States Hockey League in 1950–51. he then rejoined the Red Wings organization in 1951–52 as player coach of the Red Wings' Maritime Major Hockey League affiliate, the Glace Bay Miners. He moved up to the Wings' Western Hockey League affiliate, the Edmonton Flyers, in 1952–53. He retired as a player in 1954, but would continue to coach the Flyers until 1962. Poile then became head coach of the San Francisco Seals from 1962 to 1966.

With the NHL expansion in 1967, Poile became general manager of the Philadelphia Flyers, acquiring key members of the team that would win the Stanley Cup in the 1970s. In 1970, Poile became general manager of another NHL expansion team, the Vancouver Canucks, building that club until leaving in 1973 to join the World Hockey Association as executive vice-president. He left the WHA in May 1976.

In August 1976, Poile became president of the Central Hockey League. During the 1983–84 season he also became commissioner of the International Hockey League. The CHL wound down its operations at the end of that season, and Poile continued in his role with the IHL until retiring in 1989.

Poile was inducted into the Hockey Hall of Fame as a builder in 1990 after a hockey career that spanned six decades. He died in Vancouver on January 4, 2005, of Parkinson's disease. His son, David Poile, has also had a long management career in the National Hockey League and was the first (and current) general manager of the Nashville Predators.

Poile has had two professional hockey trophies named after him. The first was the N.R. "Bud" Poile Trophy of the International Hockey League, awarded from 1989 to 2001 to the most valuable player of the Turner Cup Playoffs. The second is the Norman R. "Bud" Poile Trophy of the American Hockey League, awarded to the team that finishes the regular season with the best record in the Western Conference.

Awards
 2nd team NHL All-Star in 1948.
 Awarded the Lester Patrick Trophy in 1989.
 Inducted into the  Hockey Hall of Fame in 1990.

Career statistics

Regular season and playoffs

Coaching statistics

1 Midseason replacement

² Replaced midseason

See also

Norman R. "Bud" Poile Trophy (AHL)
Norman R. "Bud" Poile Trophy (IHL)

External links

 

1924 births
2005 deaths
Boston Bruins players
Canadian military personnel of World War II
Chicago Blackhawks players
Deaths from Parkinson's disease
Detroit Red Wings players
Edmonton Flyers (WHL) players
Hockey Hall of Fame inductees
Ice hockey people from Ontario
Sportspeople from Thunder Bay
Lester Patrick Trophy recipients
National Hockey League executives
New York Rangers players
Neurological disease deaths in British Columbia
Philadelphia Flyers executives
Stanley Cup champions
Toronto Maple Leafs players
Vancouver Canucks general managers
Canadian ice hockey right wingers